Rosenfels is a surname. Notable people with the surname include:

Paul Rosenfels (1909–1985), American psychiatrist
Sage Rosenfels (born 1978), American football player